Antivirus software is computer software used to detect and stop malware and viruses. This article compares notable antivirus products and services, and is not a deep analysis of the strengths and weaknesses of each.

Legend 
The term "on-demand scan" refers to the possibility of performing a manual scan (by the user) on the entire computer/device, while "on-access scan" refers to the ability of a product to automatically scan every file at its creation or subsequent modification.

The term "CloudAV" refers to the ability of a product to automatically perform scans on the cloud.

The term "Email Security" refers to the protection of emails from viruses and malware, while "AntiSpam" refers to the protection from spam, scam and phishing attacks.

The term "Web protection" usually includes protection from: infected and malicious URLs, phishing websites, online identity (privacy) protection and online banking protection. Many antivirus products use "third-party antivirus engine". This means that the antivirus engine is made by another producer; however, the malware signature and/or other parts of the product may (or may not) be done from the owner of the product itself.

Desktop computers and servers

Microsoft Windows

Apple macOS

Linux

Solaris

FreeBSD

OS/2, ArcaOS

Mobile (smartphones and tablets)

Google Android

iOS

Windows Mobile
This list excludes Windows Phone 7 and Windows Phone 8 as they do not support running protection programs.

Symbian

BlackBerry

See also

 Antivirus software
 AV-Comparatives – Austrian organization testing antivirus and security software
 AV-TEST – German organization testing antivirus and security software
 Comparison of firewalls
 International Computer Security Association
 Internet Security
 List of computer viruses
 Virus Bulletin

References

Antivirus software

Lists of software